R-27 regional road is a Montenegrin roadway.

Part of the road between Dinoša and Cijevna Zatrebačka is under reconstruction. Deadline for the reconstruction is July 2020.

History

In November 2019, the Government of Montenegro published bylaw on categorisation of state roads. With new categorisation, R-27 regional road was created from municipal road.

Major intersections

References

R-27